In Greek mythology, Aglaope, also called Aglaopheme (Ἀγλαοφήμη) and Aglaophonos (Ἀγλαόφωνος), is the name of one of the Sirens. Her name means "with lambent voice". Aglaope was attested as a daughter of the river-god Achelous and the Muse Melpomene or her sister Terpsichore or Sterope, daughter of King Porthaon of Calydon. She may have two or one sister(s), namely Peisinoe or Molpe, or just Thelxiepeia or Thelxinoe.

Notes

References 

 Apollodorus, The Library with an English Translation by Sir James George Frazer, F.B.A., F.R.S. in 2 Volumes, Cambridge, MA, Harvard University Press; London, William Heinemann Ltd. 1921. . Online version at the Perseus Digital Library. Greek text available from the same website.
Bell, Robert E., Women of Classical Mythology: A Biographical Dictionary. ABC-Clio. 1991. .
Gaius Julius Hyginus, Fabulae from The Myths of Hyginus translated and edited by Mary Grant. University of Kansas Publications in Humanistic Studies. Online version at the Topos Text Project.
John Tzetzes, Book of Histories, Book I translated by Ana Untila from the original Greek of T. Kiessling's edition of 1826.  Online version at theio.com
Nonnus of Panopolis, Dionysiaca translated by William Henry Denham Rouse (1863-1950), from the Loeb Classical Library, Cambridge, MA, Harvard University Press, 1940.  Online version at the Topos Text Project.
Nonnus of Panopolis, Dionysiaca. 3 Vols. W.H.D. Rouse. Cambridge, MA., Harvard University Press; London, William Heinemann, Ltd. 1940-1942. Greek text available at the Perseus Digital Library

Sirens (mythology)
Women in Greek mythology